My Sweet Little Village is a 1985 Czechoslovak film directed by Jiří Menzel. In 1987 it was nominated for an Academy Award for Best Foreign Language Film.

Plot
The film's main storyline follows the life of Otík, a mentally backward young man, in a tight-knit village community. The sweet-tempered Otík works as a truck driver assistant to Mr. Pávek, his older colleague and practical-minded neighbor. Pávek's family and Otík's aunt Hrabětová take care of Otík, whose parents are dead. However, the two truck coworkers become at odds over Otík's inability to perform even the simplest tasks. Pávek demands that Otík be transferred to assist another driver, who happens to be a choleric and suspicious man named Turek. Rather than work with Turek, Otík decides to accept an offer of employment in Prague, but finds he does not fit into the city life. After discovering that the transfer of Otík to Prague was a trick by a crooked subordinate of the Dřevoplech company director to get a deal on Otík's large inherited house for his boss, Pávek agrees to give Otík a second chance and retrieves him from the city to resume their work together.

The film also follows several subplots, such as, the secret romance of Turek's wife with a young veterinarian, the tribulations of an accident-prone but respected doctor who has almost as much trouble with his pessimistic patients as he does with his car, and the desperate deeds of Pávek's teenage son, who has ardent feelings for an attractive local teacher.

Cast
 János Bán as Ota Rákosník
 Marián Labuda as Karel Pávek
 Rudolf Hrušínský as Dr. Skružný
 Petr Čepek as Josef Turek
 Libuše Šafránková as Jana Turková
 Jan Hartl as Václav Kašpar
 Miloslav Štibich as Vojtěch Kalina
 Oldřich Vlach as Jaromír Kunc
 Milada Ježková as Ludmila Hrabětová
 Zdeněk Svěrák as Painter Evžen Ryba
 Josef Somr as Director of Dřevoplech

Reception
In the Czech Republic and Slovakia the movie retains a cult following. The movie gained favorable reviews from movie critics, with Roger Ebert awarding the movie 3 and a half stars out of 4. "In My Sweet Little Village, (Menzel) discovers some of the same gentle, ironic humor that Forman found in The Fireman's Ball. He uses everyday life as an instrument for a subtle attack on bureaucracy and a cheerful assertion of human nature. This movie is joyful from beginning to end – a small treasure, but a real one."

Production
The film was made on location in the village of Křečovice, with some scenes in Prague.

Awards
 1986 Montreal World Film Festival – won Special Jury Award and Prize of the Ecumenical Jury
 1987 Paris Film Festival – won Best Actor award

See also
 List of submissions to the 59th Academy Awards for Best Foreign Language Film
 List of Czechoslovak submissions for the Academy Award for Best Foreign Language Film

References

External links

 New York Times Review

1985 films
1985 comedy-drama films
1980s Czech-language films
Slovak-language films
Films directed by Jiří Menzel
Films with screenplays by Zdeněk Svěrák
Czech comedy-drama films
Czechoslovak comedy-drama films